The Indianapolis Colts are a professional American football team based in Indianapolis, Indiana. They are a member of the South Division of the American Football Conference (AFC) in the National Football League (NFL). In 1953, a Baltimore-based group led by Carroll Rosenbloom won the rights to a new Baltimore franchise. Rosenbloom was granted an NFL team, and was awarded the holdings of the defunct Dallas Texans organization. The team was known as the Baltimore Colts for 31 seasons before moving to Indianapolis in March 1984.

There have been 19 head coaches for the Colts franchise. Keith Molesworth became the first coach of the Baltimore Colts in 1953, but he was reassigned to a different position with the team following the season. In terms of tenure, Weeb Ewbank has led the team for more games (112) and more complete seasons (nine) than any other head coach. He led the team to two of their NFL championships. Four Colts head coaches; Ewbank, Don Shula (3), Ted Marchibroda, and Tony Dungy have been named coach of the year by at least one major news organization. Ewbank, Shula, and Dungy are members of the Pro Football Hall of Fame, having been inducted in 1978, 1997, and 2016 respectively.

Six times in Colts history there were interim head coaches. In 1972, Don McCafferty was fired five games into the season. John Sandusky was named as the interim head coach for the rest of the season, during which he led the Colts to a 4–5 record, but he was not made the permanent coach the next year. In 1974, head coach Howard Schnellenberger started off the season 0–3 and was fired. Joe Thomas assumed the duties of head coach and finished the season at 2–12. In 1991, the Colts started off 0–5 and Ron Meyer was fired as head coach. Rick Venturi was named as the interim for the final 11 games. In 2005 Tony Dungy was forced to miss one game due to personal issues. Jim Caldwell was named as the one game interim. In 2012 offensive coordinator Bruce Arians was named as the interim head coach indefinitely after Chuck Pagano was diagnosed with leukemia four weeks into the 2012 NFL season. Arians led the Colts to a 9–3 record – the record being credited to Pagano – and made the playoffs.

Key

Coaches
Note: Statistics are accurate through the end of the 2022 NFL season.

Notes

References
General

 
 
 

Specific

 
Indianapolis Colts
Head coaches